Dunloy Cú Chulainn's is a Gaelic Athletic Association club located in Dunloy, County Antrim, Northern Ireland.  The club is almost exclusively concerned with hurling. The club competes in Antrim GAA competitions.

Hurling

Honours

Ulster Senior Club Hurling Championships:
 Winner (11): 1990, 1994, 1995, 1997, 2000, 2001, 2002, 2003, 2007, 2009, 2022
Antrim Senior Hurling Championships:
 Winner (16): 1990, 1994, 1995, 1997, 1998, 2000, 2001, 2002, 2003, 2007, 2009, 2017, 2019 2020, 2021, 2022

Football

Honours

Antrim Senior Football Championships:
Winner (6): 1924, 1925, 1926, 1931, 1935, 1936

References

External links
Antrim GAA site
Dunloy Cú Chulainn's GAA site

Gaelic games clubs in County Antrim
Hurling clubs in County Antrim
1908 establishments in Ireland